Civil rights have being part of the Constitution of the United States of America, but in order to be received equally by all the population required to made amendments to the United States Constitution, this allowed to end of slavery with the Civil Rights Act of 1866, followed by women's suffrage, among other rights,

Civil Rights Act of 1866

The Civil Rights Act of 1866 was enacted April 9, 1866, reenacted 1870) was the first United States federal law to define citizenship and affirm that all citizens are equally protected by the law. It was mainly intended, in the wake of the American Civil War, to protect the civil rights of persons of African descent born in or brought to the United States. 

The Act was passed by Congress in 1865 and vetoed by United States President Andrew Johnson. In April 1866 Congress again passed the bill to support the Thirteenth Amendment, and Johnson again vetoed it, but a two-thirds majority in each chamber overrode the veto to allow it to become law without presidential signature.

John Bingham and other congressmen argued that Congress did not yet have sufficient constitutional power to enact this law.  Following passage of the Fourteenth Amendment in 1868, Congress ratified the 1866 Act in 1870.

Enforcement Act of 1871

The Enforcement Act of 1871 is an Act of the United States Congress which empowered the President to suspend the writ of habeas corpus to combat the Ku Klux Klan (KKK) and other white supremacy organizations. The act was passed by the 42nd United States Congress and signed into law by United States President Ulysses S. Grant on April 20, 1871. The act was the last of three Enforcement Acts passed by the United States Congress from 1870 to 1871 during the Reconstruction Era to combat attacks upon the suffrage rights of African Americans. The statute has been subject to only minor changes since then, but has been the subject of voluminous interpretation by courts.

Civil Rights Act of 1875

The Civil Rights Act of 1875 was a United States federal law enacted during the Reconstruction era in response to civil rights violations against African Americans. The bill was passed by the 43rd United States Congress and signed into law by United States President Ulysses S. Grant on March 1, 1875. The act was designed to "protect all citizens in their civil and legal rights", providing for equal treatment in public accommodations and public transportation and prohibiting exclusion from jury service. It was originally drafted by Senator Charles Sumner in 1870, but was not passed until shortly after Sumner's death in 1875. The law was not effectively enforced, partly because President Grant had favored different measures to help him suppress election-related violence against blacks and Republicans in the South.

Civil Rights Act of 1957

The 1950s Civil Rights Movement pressured Congress to enact legislation to protect the constitutional civil rights of African Americans. 
The first major piece of civil rights legislation passed by Congress was the Civil Rights Act of 1957. While enforcing the voting rights of African Americans set out in the Fifteenth Amendment of the United States Constitution, the act had several loopholes. Southern states continued to discriminate against African Americans in application of voter registration and electoral laws, in segregation of school and public facilities, and in employment.

The Civil Rights Act of 1957 was the first federal civil rights legislation passed by the United States Congress since the Civil Rights Act of 1875. The bill was passed by the 85th United States Congress and signed into law by President Dwight D. Eisenhower on September 9, 1957.

Civil Rights Act of 1960

The legislation was proposed by President Dwight D. Eisenhower in his message to the 86th Congress on February 5, 1959, when he stated "that every individual regardless of his race, religion, or national origin is entitled to the equal protection of the laws."

Civil Rights Act of 1964

The Civil Rights Act of 1964 is a landmark civil rights and labor law in the United States that outlaws discrimination based on race, color, religion, sex, national origin, and later sexual orientation and gender identity. It prohibits unequal application of voter registration requirements, racial segregation in schools and public accommodations, and employment discrimination. The act "remains one of the most significant legislative achievements in American history".

Civil Rights Act of 1968

The Civil Rights Act of 1968 is a landmark law in the United States signed into law by United States President Lyndon B. Johnson during the King assassination riots.

Titles II through VII comprise the Indian Civil Rights Act, which applies to the Native American tribes of the United States and makes many but not all of the guarantees of the U.S. Bill of Rights applicable within the tribes. (that Act appears today in Title 25, sections 1301 to 1303 of the United States Code). Titles VIII through IX are commonly known as the Fair Housing Act. Title X, commonly known as the Anti-Riot Act

Civil Rights Restoration Act of 1987

The Civil Rights Restoration Act is a United States legislative act that specifies that recipients of federal funds must comply with civil rights laws in all areas, not just in the particular program or activity that received federal funding.

Civil Rights Act of 1991

The Civil Rights Act of 1991 is a United States labor law, passed in response to United States Supreme Court decisions that limited the rights of employees who had sued their employers for discrimination.

See also
United States labor law
Older Americans Act
No Child Left Behind Act
Executive Order 11063
Native American civil rights
History of civil rights in the United States

Notes

References

United States federal civil rights legislation